The knockout stages of the 2013 Copa Libertadores de América were played from April 24 to July 24, 2013. A total of 16 teams competed in the knockout stages.

Qualified teams
The winners and runners-up of each of the eight groups in the second stage qualified for the knockout stages.

Seeding
The qualified teams were seeded in the knockout stages according to their results in the second stage, with the group winners seeded 1–8, and the group runners-up seeded 9–16.

Format
In the knockout stages, the 16 teams played a single-elimination tournament, with the following rules:
Each tie was played on a home-and-away two-legged basis, with the higher-seeded team hosting the second leg. However, CONMEBOL required that the second leg of the finals must be played in South America, i.e., a finalist from Mexico must host the first leg regardless of seeding.
In the round of 16, quarterfinals, and semifinals, if tied on aggregate, the away goals rule was used. If still tied, the penalty shoot-out was used to determine the winner (no extra time was played).
In the finals, if tied on aggregate, the away goals rule was not used, and 30 minutes of extra time was played. If still tied after extra time, the penalty shoot-out was used to determine the winner.
If there were two semifinalists from the same association, they must play each other.

Bracket
The bracket of the knockout stages was determined by the seeding as follows:
Round of 16:
Match A: Seed 1 vs. Seed 16
Match B: Seed 2 vs. Seed 15
Match C: Seed 3 vs. Seed 14
Match D: Seed 4 vs. Seed 13
Match E: Seed 5 vs. Seed 12
Match F: Seed 6 vs. Seed 11
Match G: Seed 7 vs. Seed 10
Match H: Seed 8 vs. Seed 9
Quarterfinals:
Match S1: Winner A vs. Winner H
Match S2: Winner B vs. Winner G
Match S3: Winner C vs. Winner F
Match S4: Winner D vs. Winner E
Semifinals: (if there were two semifinalists from the same association, they must play each other)
Match F1: Winner S1 vs. Winner S4
Match F2: Winner S2 vs. Winner S3
Finals: Winner F1 vs. Winner F2

Round of 16
The first legs were played on April 24–25 and April 30–May 2, and the second legs were played on May 8–9 and 14–16, 2013.

|}

Match A

Atlético Mineiro won 6–2 on aggregate.

Match B

Tied 2–2 on aggregate, Santa Fe won on away goals.

Match C

Olimpia won 3–2 on aggregate.

Match D

Boca Juniors won 2–1 on aggregate.

Match E

Tied 2–2 on aggregate, Newell's Old Boys won on away goals.

Match F

Fluminense won 3–2 on aggregate.

Match G

Tied 1–1 on aggregate, Real Garcilaso won on penalties.

Match H

Tijuana won 2–1 on aggregate.

Quarterfinals
The first legs were played on May 22–23, and the second legs were played on May 28–30, 2013.

|}

Match S1

Tied 3–3 on aggregate, Atlético Mineiro won on away goals.

Match S2

Santa Fe won 5–1 on aggregate.

Match S3

Olimpia won 2–1 on aggregate.

Match S4

Tied 0–0 on aggregate, Newell's Old Boys won on penalties.

Semifinals
The first legs were played on July 2–3, and the second legs were played on July 9–10, 2013.

|}

Match F1

Tied 2–2 on aggregate, Atlético Mineiro won on penalties.

Match F2

Olimpia won 2–1 on aggregate.

Finals

The finals were played on a home-and-away two-legged basis, with the higher-seeded team hosting the second leg. The teams tied on aggregate, the away goals rule was not used, and 30 minutes of extra time were played. A penalty shoot-out was used to determine the winner.

The first leg was played on July 17, and the second leg was played on July 24, 2013.

Tied 2–2 on aggregate, Atlético Mineiro won on penalties.

References

External links
 
Copa Libertadores, CONMEBOL.com 

3